Rory's Jester was a notable Australian Thoroughbred racehorse and sire. A chestnut son of Crown Jester from Rory's Rocket (GB) by Roan Rocket, he was trained by Colin Hayes.

Some of his major race victories include the 1985 STC  Golden Slipper Stakes, STC Pago Pago Stakes and the SAJC R.N. Irwin Stakes. He also finished second (to Hula Chief) in the 1986 VRC Lightning Stakes. Predominantly a speed horse, he won races over sprint distances ranging from 1,000m to 1,200m.

Since retiring to stud he became Australian Champion First Season Sire with his first crop of precocious and speedy two-year-olds. His outstanding progeny included Racer's Edge, Chortle, Happy Giggle, Isca and Light Up The World. 

Rory's Jester was retired from stud duties in 2005. He was humanely euthanized at Swettenham Stud in Victoria in 2007 at the age of 24.

Race record
17 starts - 7 wins, 6 seconds, 0 thirds

Prize money 
A$509,850

Major wins 
Rory’s Jester won the following major races:

 1985 STC Golden Slipper Stakes – G1 (1200m)
 1985 STC Pago Pago Stakes – G3 (1200m)
 1985 VRC The Black Douglas – G3  (1100m)
 1986 SAJC R.N. Irwin Stakes – G2 (1100m)
 1984 WATC L.R.Connell Quality Stakes - Listed (1000m)

References

1982 racehorse births
2007 racehorse deaths
Racehorses bred in Australia
Racehorses trained in Australia
Thoroughbred family 1-m